The Beauty from Peran (Greek: 'Η ομορφιά από τον Περάν, Turkish: Beyoğlu güzeli) is a 1953 Greek-Turkish romance film directed by Vedat Örfi Bengü and Orestis Laskos and starring Katia Linta, Süha Dogan and Muazzez Arçay.

Cast
 Katia Linta as Ermioni  
 Süha Dogan as Aimilios Irakleitos  
 Muazzez Arçay 
 Mesut Sürmeli 
 Muazzez Dogan 
 Lilian Gris
 Jenny Diamanti 
 E.P. Karli 
 Mimis Mihalopoulos 
 Renos Vrettakos

References

Bibliography
 Agâh Özgüç. Türk sinemasında İstanbul. Horizon International, 2010.

External links
 

1953 films
1953 romantic drama films
1950s Greek-language films
Turkish romantic drama films
Greek romantic drama films
Turkish multilingual films
Greek multilingual films
Greek black-and-white films
Turkish black-and-white films